Larry Graham Jr. (born August 14, 1946) is an American bassist and baritone singer, both with the psychedelic soul/funk band Sly and the Family Stone and as the founder and frontman of Graham Central Station. In 1980, he released the single "One in a Million You", which reached the top ten on the US Billboard Hot 100. He is credited with the invention of the slapping technique on the electric bass guitar, which radically expanded the tonal palette of the bass, although he himself refers to the technique as "thumpin' and pluckin' ". In 1993, he was inducted into the Rock and Roll Hall of Fame as a member of the Sly and the Family Stone. He is also the uncle of rapper Drake.

Life and career
Born in Beaumont, Texas to successful musicians, Graham played bass in the funk band Sly and the Family Stone from 1967 to 1972. It is said that he pioneered the art of slap-pop playing on the electric bass, in part to provide percussive and rhythmic elements in addition to the notes of the bass line when his mother decided to no longer have a drummer in her band, while Graham also admits in a BBC documentary on funk music that he is unsure if it was done on economical grounds; the slap of the thumb being used to emulate a bass drum and the pop of the index or middle finger as a snare drum. This style has become archetypal of modern funk. Slap-pop playing couples a percussive thumb-slapping technique of the lower strings with an aggressive finger-snap of the higher strings, often in rhythmic alternation. The slap and pop technique incorporates a large ratio of muted or "dead" notes to normal notes, which adds to the rhythmic effect.

This "slap" bass style was later used by such artists as Bootsy Collins (P-Funk), Les Claypool (Primus), Bernard Edwards (Chic), Louis Johnson, Mark King, Keni Burke, Victor Wooten, Kim Clarke of Defunkt, Flea (Red Hot Chili Peppers), Marcus Miller, and Stanley Clarke.

After Sly and the Family Stone, Graham formed his own band, Graham Central Station. The name is a pun on Grand Central Station, the train station located in Manhattan, New York City. Graham Central Station had several hits in the 1970s, including "Hair".

In the mid-1970s, Larry Graham worked with Betty Davis, the second ex-wife of jazz musician Miles Davis. Betty Davis' band included members of the Tower of Power horns and the Pointer Sisters, and she recorded three albums to critical acclaim but limited commercial success.

In 1975, Graham became one of Jehovah's Witnesses. Eventually, he was credited with introducing Prince to the faith. In the early 1980s, Graham recorded five solo albums and had several solo hits on the R&B chart. His biggest hit was "One in a Million You", a crossover hit, which reached No. 9 on the Billboard Hot 100 chart in 1980.

He reformed Graham Central Station in the early 1990s and performed with the band for several years during which they released two live albums. One was recorded in Japan in 1992, and the other, recorded in London in 1996, had only 1000 copies printed and was exclusively sold at concerts.

In 1998, he recorded a solo album under the name Graham Central Station GCS 2000. It was a collaboration between Larry Graham and Prince. While Graham wrote all the songs, except one co-written by Prince, the album was co-arranged and co-produced by Prince, and most of the instruments and vocals were recorded by both Graham and Prince. Graham also played bass on tours with Prince from 1997 to 2000. He appeared in Prince's 1998 VHS Beautiful Strange and 1999 DVD Rave Un2 the Year 2000. He has since appeared with Prince at various international venues.

Graham and Graham Central Station performed internationally with a world tour in 2010 and the "Funk Around the World" international tour in 2011. He appeared with Andre Beeka as a special guest at Jim James' "Rock N' Soul Dance Party Superjam" at the 2013 Bonnaroo Music Festival.

Graham is the father of singer-songwriter and producer Darric Graham. He is also brothers with Dennis Graham, making Larry Graham the uncle of Canadian rapper and actor Drake.

Discography

With Sly and the Family Stone
 1967: A Whole New Thing
 1968: Dance to the Music
 1968: Life
 1969: Stand!
 1971: There's a Riot Goin' On
 1973: Fresh

With Graham Central Station
 Graham Central Station (Warner Bros., 1974)
 Release Yourself  (Warner Bros., 1974)
 Ain't No 'Bout-A-Doubt It (Warner Bros., 1975)
 Mirror (Warner Bros., 1976)
 Now Do U Wanta Dance (Warner Bros., 1977)
 My Radio Sure Sounds Good to Me (Warner Bros., 1978)
 Star Walk (Warner Bros., 1979)
 Live in Japan (1992)
 Live in London (1996)
 Back by Popular Demand (1998)
 The Best of Larry Graham and Graham Central Station, Vol. 1 (Warner Bros., 1996)
 Raise Up (2012)

Solo albums
All Warner Bros. releases

NPG Records release
 1998: GCS2000 (as Graham Central Station)

Self-released
 2019: Chillin' Singles

Notes

References

External links

 A bio from the Ultimate Band List.
 "Release Yourself: From Sly Stone's roughhouse to the Artist's clubhouse, groundbreaking bassist Larry Graham finds new power in Minnesota", City Pages'', July 21, 1999.
 Larry Graham talks about his grandmother's support and sacrifice – NAMM Oral History Interview (2014)

1946 births
20th-century American bass guitarists
21st-century American bass guitarists
American jazz bass guitarists
Living people
African-American male singers
American male bass guitarists
African-American rock musicians
American baritones
American funk bass guitarists
American funk singers
American Jehovah's Witnesses
American rhythm and blues bass guitarists
Converts to Jehovah's Witnesses
People from Beaumont, Texas
Singers from Texas
Sly and the Family Stone members
Songwriters from Texas
Guitarists from Texas
American male jazz musicians
African-American songwriters
African-American guitarists